Maldives competed at the 2018 Asian Games in Jakarta and Palembang, Indonesia, from 18 August to 2 September 2018.

Competitors 
The following is a list of the number of competitors representing Maldives that participated at the Games:

Athletics 

Maldives entered four athletes (2 men's and 2 women's) to participate in the athletics competition at the Games.

Badminton 

Men

Women

Mixed

Football 

Maldives women's team were drawn in the Group A at the Games.

Summary

Women's tournament 

Roster

Group A

Shooting 

Men

Women

Swimming

Men

Women

Mixed

Table tennis 

Individual

Team

Tennis 

Men

Women

Mixed

Volleyball

Beach volleyball

Indoor volleyball

Men's tournament

Team roster
The following is the Maldives roster in the men's volleyball tournament of the 2018 Asian Games.

Head coach: Sajid Mohamed

Pool F

13th–20th quarterfinal

19th place game

References

Nations at the 2018 Asian Games
2018
Asian Games